The women's 4×200 metre freestyle relay took place on 18 August at the Olympic Aquatic Centre of the Athens Olympic Sports Complex in Athens, Greece.

The U.S. women's swimming team (Natalie Coughlin, Carly Piper, Dana Vollmer, and Kaitlin Sandeno) broke the oldest world record in the book, when they clocked at 7:53.42, slashing 2.05 seconds off the old, mark set by the East Germans exactly 17 years ago. Leading off the race, Coughlin swam a fastest split and a personal best of 1:57.74, which became quicker than a gold-medal performance of 1:58.03 set by Romania's Camelia Potec in the individual 200 m freestyle.

With Team USA taking its third straight title since the event's Olympic debut in 1996, China made a surprise packet with a silver medal, in an Asian record of 7:55.97. Meanwhile, the unified Germans held off the Aussies for the bronze in 7:57.35, 45-hundredths of a second under an old Olympic record set by Team USA in 2000. Despite missing the podium by 0.05 of a second, the Australians broke their national record of 7:57.40 to settle only for fourth place.

Records
Prior to this competition, the existing world and Olympic records were as follows.

The following new world and Olympic records were set during this competition.

Results

Heats

Final

References

External links
Official Olympic Report

W
2004 in women's swimming
Women's events at the 2004 Summer Olympics